John Farry (born 1958, Enniskillen) is a Northern Irish singer/songwriter from Garrison, County Fermanagh, Northern Ireland. He played in Irish Country bands ''Toledo, Amarillo,Tennessee Sunshine as a vocalist and guitarist before launching a solo career and a songwriting career.

 Historically he is best known for writing the Irish entry for the 1997 Eurovision Song Contest - a song entitled "Mysterious Woman" which achieved second place. He is currently one of Irelands most prolific songwriters 

He continues to write songs and to perform throughout Ireland as a singer songwriter alongside a successful career in music management, managing Country and Irish star Nathan Carter.

References

External links
Official website

1959 births
Living people
Songwriters from Northern Ireland
People from Enniskillen
Musicians from County Fermanagh